Salmin Atiq Al Rumaihi (born 11 January 1997), is a Qatari professional footballer who plays as a midfielder for Qatar Stars League side Qatar.

Career statistics

Club

Notes

References

External links

1997 births
Living people
Qatari footballers
Association football midfielders
Qatar Stars League players
El Jaish SC players
Al-Duhail SC players
Umm Salal SC players
Qatar SC players